Kenneth Harold Johnson (born 9 November 1923) was a South African cricketer. He played in thirteen first-class matches for Eastern Province between 1950/51 and 1953/54.

See also
 List of Eastern Province representative cricketers

References

External links
 

1923 births
Possibly living people
South African cricketers
Eastern Province cricketers
Cricketers from Cape Town